The 2020–21 KK Crvena zvezda season has been the 76th season in the existence of the club. For the season it's referred to as KK Crvena zvezda mts for sponsorship reasons.

The season is the first to be played after the previous season was abandoned due to the COVID-19 pandemic.

Summary

Pre-season
In May 2020, the 2019–20 season was canceled due to the COVID-19 pandemic in the Adriatic League and the EuroLeague. The Serbian SuperLeague had no start due to the COVID-19 pandemic. On 29 June 2020, the ABA League Assembly canceled the 2020 ABA Super Cup due to the COVID-19 pandemic.

On 25 August 2020, guard Marko Gušić officially signed a four-year professional contract.

On 8 September 2020, guards Dejan Davidovac and Ognjen Dobrić signed a two-year contract extensions. On 29 September, center Ognjen Kuzmić signed a two-year contract extension.

January 
On 27 January 2021, center Johnny O'Bryant received a 10-day suspension from the club due to a conflict with head coach Dejan Radonjić during a game against Anadolu Efes.

February 
On 6 February, it was reported that 10 players were infected with COVID-19. Reportedly, guards Corey Walden, Quino Colom, Langston Hall, and center Landry Nnoko as well as coaching staff members Nikola Birač, Saša Kosović, and Aleksandar Lukman were infected with the virus. On 9 February, head coach Radonjić announced the Zvezda squad for the Radivoj Korać Cup, adding Crvena zvezda U19 players Nikola Šaranović i Milutin Vujičić to the roster. On 10 February, it was reported that one more player was infected with COVID-19. Later that day, it was announced that the infected player is center Duop Reath. Instead of Reath, the club added center O'Bryant to the squad for Radivoj Korać Cup. The Zvezda won its 7th Cup title (10th overall) following a 73–60 win over Mega Soccerbet in the final.

On 23 February, guard Milutin Vujičić officially signed a four-year professional contract. On 24 February, Crvena zvezda signed professional contracts with two more teenagers from their youth system, center Filip Branković and guard Marko Mihailović.

March 
Following a lost to Olympiacos, the club recorded its 8-in-a-row EuroLeague defeat setting the club's new records for defeats.

Players

Current roster

Players with multiple nationalities
   Marko Jagodić-Kuridža
   Ognjen Kuzmić
   Duop Reath
   Corey Walden

Depth chart

On loan
The following players were on loan during the 2020–21 season.

Guard Filip Čović retired from professional basketball in May 2021.

Transactions

Players In

|}

Players Out

|}

Club

Technical staff 
On 8 June 2020, head coach Dragan Šakota parted ways with the Zvezda due to health issues ending his second spell as a head coach. Two days later, the club named Saša Obradović as the new head coach. On the same day, the head coach Obradović introduced his coaching staff; assistant coaches Milenko Bogićević and Bogdan Karaičić, as well as conditioning coach Duško Marković. Prior to that, assistant coaches from the previous season Andrija Gavrilović and Milenko Topić, as well as conditioning coach Aleksandar Lukman left the staff. The sports director Žarko Čabarkapa left the club after the 2019–20 season.

On 24 December 2020, head coach Obradović and the Zvezda parted ways by mutual consent. Following the departure of coach Obradović, assistant coaches Bogićević and Karaičić and conditioning coach Marković left also. On 25 December, the Zvezda hired Dejan Radonjić as the new head coach. Following Radonjić's arrival conditioning coach Lukman and assistant coach Nikola Birač were added to the coaching staff. Both coaches returned to the Zvezda. On 30 December, the Zvezda added two more assistant coaches to the staff, Goran Bošković and Miodrag Dinić.

The following is the technical staff of Crvena zvezda for the 2020–21 season.

Uniform
Crvena zvezda signed a three-year partnership contract with Adidas on 31 July 2020. Crvena zvezda debuted their new Adidas uniforms for the 2019–20 season after unveiling on 6 September 2020, on the EuroLeague Media Day. The third uniform was unveiled on 8 April 2021.

The following is a list of corporate sponsorship patches on a uniform of Crvena zvezda and uniform designs for the 2020–21 season.

Supplier: Adidas
Main sponsor: mts
Back sponsor: Idea (top), Soccerbet (bottom)
Shorts sponsor: None

Pre-season and friendlies
Crvena zvezda played at the 2020 Gloria Cup Basketball Tournament II in Antalya, Turkey which took place from 8–13 September. Afterward, the 2020 Gomelsky Cup was cancelled due to COVID-19 pandemic. It would have been played in Moscow, Russia from 16 to 19 September.

Competitions

Overall

Overview

Adriatic League

Regular season

Results summary

Results by round

Matches
Note: All times are local CET (UTC+1) as listed by the ABA League. Some games was played behind closed doors (BCD) due to the COVID-19 pandemic in Europe.

Playoffs

EuroLeague

Regular season

Results summary

Results by round

Matches
 
Note: All times are CET (UTC+1) as listed by EuroLeague. Some games was played behind closed doors (BCD) due to the COVID-19 pandemic in Europe.

Serbian League

The 2020–21 Basketball League of Serbia is the 15th season of the Serbian highest professional basketball league. The Zvezda is the defending champions.

Playoffs

Note: All times are local CET (UTC+1) as listed by the Basketball League of Serbia. Some games will be played behind closed doors (BCD) due to the COVID-19 pandemic in Serbia.

Radivoj Korać Cup 

The 2021 Radivoj Korać Cup is the 19th season of the Serbian men's national basketball cup tournament. The tournament was held in Novi Sad between 11 and 14 February 2021. The club won its 7th Serbian Cup title following a 73–60 win over Mega Soccerbet.

All times are local UTC+1.

Adriatic Supercup 

The 2020 ABA Super Cup was scheduled to be the 4th tournament of the ABA Super Cup. On 29 June 2020, the ABA League Assembly canceled the tournament due to the COVID-19 pandemic.

It would have been played between 20 and 23 September 2020 in Podgorica, Montenegro.

Individual awards

ABA League 
MVP of the Round

Source: ABA League

Finals MVP 

Ideal Starting Five

Best Defender

EuroLeague 
MVP of the Round

Serbian League 
Finals MVP Award

Serbian Cup 
MVP Award

Statistics

Adriatic League

EuroLeague

Serbian SuperLeague

Radivoj Korać Cup

Head coaches records 

Updated:

Notes

See also 
2020–21 Red Star Belgrade season

References

External links
 KK Crvena zvezda official website
 Crvena zvezda at the Adriatic League 
 Crvena zvezda at the EuroLeague

KK Crvena Zvezda seasons
Crvena zvezda
Crvena zvezda
Crvena zvezda